The Malibu Rapids forms the entrance to Princess Louisa Inlet and is also connected to the Jervis Inlet.  The tidal flow of both inlets pass through this narrow and shallow passage that creates a fast moving (approximately ) and strong tidal rapids during the peak flows.  At slack tide, the entrance is virtually flat calm similar to the
Skookumchuck Narrows near the entrance of the Jervis Inlet.

The way to determine the direction of the tidal flow at the narrows is to observe the direction in which the tide is flowing.  If the tidal flow is heading toward the
Jervis Inlet then the tide is going out (low tide). But if the flow is moving toward Princess Louisa Inlet the tide it is coming in (high tide).

The entrance is large enough to allow marine traffic through.  The narrow passage is defined by Malibu Isle and a System B type Lateral navigation beacon on the Jervis Inlet side and Malibu and the mainland on the Princess Louisa Inlet side.

References

External links
 
Malibu Club Web Site
BCGNIS Geographical Geographical Name Detail for the Malibu Rapids
Tides at Malibu*
 Princess Louisa Inlet and Malibu Videos
Sunshine Coast Regional District
Straits of British Columbia
New Westminster Land District